Carlos Jacott (born July 28, 1967) is an American actor. He has guest-starred in numerous television series, such as Seinfeld, Firefly, CSI: Crime Scene Investigation, Buffy the Vampire Slayer, Angel, and Studio 60 on the Sunset Strip. He has starred in films, such as Kicking and Screaming, Mr. Jealousy, Being John Malkovich, The Last Days of Disco, Grosse Pointe Blank, and Fun with Dick and Jane.

Filmography

External links

References 

1967 births
Living people
American male film actors
American male television actors
Place of birth missing (living people)